Ollie Keller (March 8, 1929 – April 21, 2019) was an American football player and coach. He served as the head football coach at Northeast Louisiana University—now known as University of Louisiana at Monroe—in Monroe, Louisiana for four seasons, from 1972 until 1975, compiling record of 14–24–3.

Coaching career
Keller began his coaching career at Halls High School followed by two years at his high school alma mater, Maryville High School. He spent the next ten years coaching at Memphis Catholic High School (1957–1967), which was a perennial football powerhouse. Keller moved to the college level in 1968 as an assistant at Iowa State University under Johnny Majors before returning to Memphis State as an assistant in 1970.

Death
Keller died on April 21, 2019, at his home in Fairhope, Alabama.

Head coaching record

References

1929 births
2019 deaths
American men's basketball players
American football halfbacks
Colorado State Rams football coaches
Iowa State Cyclones football coaches
Louisiana–Monroe Warhawks football coaches
Memphis Tigers football coaches
Memphis Tigers football players
Memphis Tigers men's basketball players
Tennessee Volunteers football players
High school football coaches in Tennessee
People from Maryville, Tennessee
Coaches of American football from Tennessee
Players of American football from Tennessee
Basketball players from Tennessee